WRRS is an FM radio station licensed to Middleborough Center, Massachusetts and is owned by Talking Information Center, Incorporated.  WRRS operates with 400 watts on 88.5 MHz (Channel 203).  It broadcasts programming from the Talking Information Center, a radio reading service for blind people normally heard on F.M. subcarriers.  WRRS was granted its callsign on October 29, 2010.  It began broadcasting in 2012. WRRS went silent as of December 28, 2016, but returned to the air December 22, 2017.

Sale to Academy of the Immaculate
On October 1, 2021, it was announced that WRRS would be sold to the Academy of the Immaculate for $85,000. Academy of the Immaculate owns WPMW, also on 88.5 MHz.

References

External links 
 WRRS's page on the T.I.C. site

Middleborough, Massachusetts
RRS
Mass media in Plymouth County, Massachusetts
Radio stations established in 2012